Derek Kok Jing-hung  (born 18 November 1964) is a Hong Kong actor who had worked for TVB from 1986 to 2015. He filmed over 70 dramas. He is specialised in action and Chinese Kung Fu performance.

Career
His career started when he entered the New Talent Singing Awards in 1985.  Even though he only made it through to the semi-finals, his stage performance, including the acrobatics he demonstrated throughout his performance impressed the folks at TVB.  He then entered the TVB Artiste Training Class in 1985 and was signed with the station after completion of the program. The first notable role he played was Lee Yuen Ba in The Grand Canal. He left TVB in 2015 to sign a contract with a mainland Chinese company. In 2020, he also signed a contract with Shaw Brothers.

Personal life
Between 2007 and 2010, Kok was rumoured to be involved with actress Joyce Tang, but both have insisted to have only been good friends. He has been married with his current wife since 2011 and has two daughters.

Filmography

TV series

TV films
Killer's Code (1995)
She Was Married To Mob (1996)

Films

References

External links
TVB.com Derek Kok's Official Blog 
Derek Kok at Hong Kong Cinemagic
Derek Kok at the Hong Kong Movie Database

Hong Kong male television actors
TVB actors
New Talent Singing Awards contestants
1964 births
Living people
20th-century Hong Kong male actors
21st-century Hong Kong male actors